Placilla may refer to:

 Placilla, the Chilean town;
 Placilla, a variant name for Aelia Flaccilla, wife of the Roman Emperor Theodosius I (the Great).